Stefano Quintarelli (born 14 June 1965) is an Italian IT specialist and a descendant of the Italian writer Emilio Salgari. He was a member of the Italian Parliament in the XVII legislature, as part of the Civics and Innovators group.

He was a member of telecommunications and transport commission in Italian Parliament during the XVII Legislature and is President of AGID (Government agency for digital Italy)

Quintarelli was included in a Corriere della Sera article on the thirty most innovative Italian entrepreneurs.

After leaving BT group in 2007, until July 2012 he was a managing director of the digital area of Il Sole 24 Ore, an Italian financial newspaper. He left office when he was proposed as an independent candidate for the presidency of AGCOM, the Italian communications authority. In proposing his candidacy, the Italian section of ISOC, the Internet Society, likened him to one of the great figures of the Renaissance. 

In 2015 he formally defined the concept of Device Neutrality and proposed a bill to enforce it in Italy.  The bill was stopped at the final vote at the Senate in 2017, after many successful votes at the Chamber of Deputies and through all Senate committees, thanks to lobbying efforts by some multinational device manufacturers and telecom operators. The law has since gained formal support at the European Commission by BEUC, the European Consumer Organisation, the Electronic Frontier Foundation and the Hermes Center for Transparency and digital human rights. A law with identic principles has been passed in South Korea and the French telecoms regulator ARCEP has called for the introduction of Device Neutrality in Europe.

He theorized the Internet as a dimension of existence, in which social and economic relations are created and developed and the emergence of a new class conflict between intermediaries and intermediated that surrounds and dominates the traditional conflict between capitalists and proletarians, thus introducing in addition to the traditional categories of capital and labor, the information category which is controlled by a small number of info-plutocrats.

Since 2014, he is the chairman of AgID, Italy's digital agency. He has been recognized as one of the 30 most innovative entrepreneurs in Italy and is considered one of the world's 100 most influential people in digital government.

He chaired the expert group who authored, for the first time ever, “The information society and the future of digital well being”, a section of “Global happiness and well being policy report”.

He sits on the board of trustees of Nexa Center for Internet and Society, is a member of the Leadership Council of the Sustainable Development Solutions Network for the United Nations and is a member of the High-Level Expert Group on Artificial Intelligence of the European Commission.

References

Italian businesspeople
1965 births
Living people